The Women's synchronized 3 metre springboard competition at the 2017 World Championships was held on 17 July 2017.

Results
The preliminary round was started at 10:00. The final was held at 16:00.

Green denotes finalists

References

Women's synchronized 3 metre springboard